, provisional designation: , is a large, high-order resonant trans-Neptunian object in the outermost regions of the Solar System, approximately  in diameter. Long-term observations suggest that the object is in a meta-stable 5:21 resonance with Neptune. Other sources classify it as a scattered disc object.
It is possibly large enough to be a dwarf planet.

First observation and orbit 

The Minor Planet Center credits the object's first official observation on 10 May 2010 to Pan-STARRS  at Haleakala Observatory, Hawaii, United States. The observations were made by Pan-STARRS Outer Solar System Survey. There are 4 February 1951 precovery images from the Palomar Observatory Sky Survey, extending the observation arc by approximately 60 years. The precovery images are from the same year the object came to perihelion (closest approach to the Sun).

 orbits the Sun at a distance of 39.6–118 AU once every 699 years and 5 months (semi-major axis of 78.8 AU). Its orbit has a high eccentricity of 0.50 and an inclination of 32° with respect to the ecliptic.

Numbering and naming 

This minor planet was numbered by the Minor Planet Center on 10 August 2021, receiving the number  in the minor planet catalog. , it has not been named.

Physical characteristics

Photometry 

Photometric observations of  gave a monomodal lightcurve with slow rotation period of 30.6 hours, suggesting a rather spherical shape with significant albedo patchiness. An alternative period solution of a bimodal lightcurve is considered less likely. It would double the period and imply an ellipsoidal shape with an axis-ratio of at least 1.58.

Diameter and albedo 

The object's mean diameter has been estimated to measure 574 and 735 kilometers, with an assumed albedo of 0.09, by Michael Brown and the Johnston's Archive respectively, while the discoverers estimate a diameter of 600–900 kilometers with an estimated albedo of 0.21 to 0.07.

References

External links 
 MPEC, 18 September 2017
 1951 precovery images
 
 

Trans-Neptunian objects
574372
Trans-Neptunian objects in a 5:21 resonance
574372
574372
20100517